Laudakia agrorensis, the Agror agama, is a species of agamid lizard. It is found in eastern Afghanistan, northwestern India (Punjab, Himachal Pradesh, Jammu, Kashmir), and northern Pakistan.

References

Further reading
 Ananjeva, N.B. & Tuniev 1994 Some aspects of historical biogeography of Asian rock agamids Russ. J. Herpetol. 1 (1): 43
 Baig, K.J. & Böhme, W. 1995 Partition of the Stellio-group of Agama. 8th Ord. Gen. Meet. Soc. Europ. Herpet.: 36
 Stoliczka, F. 1872 Notes on some new species of Reptilia and Amphibia collected by Dr. W. Waagen in north-Western Punjab. P. Asiat. Soc. Bengal 1872: 124-131

Laudakia
Lizards of Asia
Reptiles of Afghanistan
Reptiles of India
Reptiles of Pakistan
Reptiles described in 1872
Taxa named by Ferdinand Stoliczka